Hearthstone is an online free-to-play collectible card game by Blizzard Entertainment.

Hearthstone may also refer to:

 A stone that makes up part of a hearth, or fireplace
 Hearthstone, Derbyshire, a location in England
 Hearthstone Castle, in Connecticut, U.S.
 Hearthstone Historic House Museum, in Appleton, Wisconsin, U.S.
 Hicklin Hearthstone, a historical building in Lexington, Missouri, U.S.

See also 
 Heartstone (disambiguation)
 Stonehearth